Walkerville, Ontario, is a former town in Canada, that is today a heritage precinct of Windsor, Ontario. The town was founded by Hiram Walker in 1890, owner and producer of Canadian Club Whisky. Walker planned it as a 'model town’, (originally called 'Walker's Town'), that would be the envy of both the region and the continent. He established a distillery on the Detroit River and grew his business by growing grain, milling flour, and raising cattle and hogs. Later, the town supported other major industries, notably automotive manufacturing.  It was annexed to Windsor, July 1, 1935.

Architecture
Walker established homes for his workers, a church dedicated to his late wife, and a school. The town, which developed outward from the distillery, included buildings designed by Albert Kahn, notably Willistead Manor, the home of Walker's second son, Edward Chandler Walker. Upon Walkerville’s eventual amalgamation with Windsor, the Manor became heritage-protected property of the city, being used as an art gallery and, currently, a function venue.

The neighbourhood is characterized by large houses, wide streets and abundant greenery. A three-story high school, carrying the name 'Walkerville', stands next to Willistead Manor. Other structures include former prime minister Paul Martin’s home, Kahn-designed houses, the distillery (now belonging to Wiser’s ) and the Via Rail station. The Tivoli Theatre (recently reopened Old Walkerville Theatre), is of 1920s art-deco design by C. Howard Crane (who would also design the Fox Theater in Detroit, Michigan). A large performance stage, ornate fixtures, balconies, and grating-lattice hint at the community's grandeur in those days.

Social and industrial growth

Divided into three sub-precincts, Walkerville was an amalgam of business, commercial, and residential land use, at times all nestled together. This cohesive character gave the community its uniqueness as compared to surrounding cities. Walker acted as self-appointed overseer of everything, including the police, fire and church facilities.

During the period of Prohibition in the United States,  Walkerville became a principal source of cross-border alcohol exportation.

Hiram Walker favoured diversification and Walkerville welcomed many industries including the automotive industry. The Ford Motor Company of Canada opened its factory there in 1904, followed by the E-M-F Company whose plant was acquired by Studebaker in 1910 and which became the assembly line for right-hand-drive vehicles exported to the UK and British Empire. In 1929, the Financial Post reported that 500 of the town's families were supported by Studebaker, "only one of its activities being the manufacture of motor cars. During the world war, great quantities of war material was produced for the Canadian and Imperial governments. Today, [the plant] manufactures a line of 59 models of six- and eight-cylinder passenger motor cars, trucks, ambulances, and funeral coaches". Chrysler, General Motors and Seagrave were other manufacturers with plants in Walkerville.

See also
 Walkerville Collegiate Institute

References

Gallery

Further reading
Walkerville Times 2007 14mB pdf download containing historical articles and photographs

External links

 WalkervilleTimes.com
 Southwestern Ontario Digital Archive: Walkerville (Ontario)
  History of Windsor (including Walkerville)

Neighbourhoods in Windsor, Ontario
Company towns in Canada
Former towns in Ontario
Alcohol in Canada
Populated places established in 1890
1890 establishments in Ontario
1935 disestablishments in Ontario